The 1974 Safari Rally (formally the 22nd East African Safari Rally) was the second round of the shortened 1974 World Rally Championship season. It took place between 11 and 15 April 1974. The Safari Rally didn't use special stages at this time to decide a winner. Instead all of the route was competitive -  with the driver with the lowest accumulation of penalty time between time controls being declared the winner.

Report 
The rally was won by local driver, and Safari specialist Joginder Singh. Singh beat off competition from WRC regulars such as Björn Waldegård and Sandro Munari to secure his first WRC victory. The Safari often saw unheralded cars on the winners ramp and this year was no exception - the Mitsubishi Colt Lancer scored no more points throughout the rest of the season. Fiat held on to their lead in the championship for manufacturers through picking up one point for tenth place.

Results 

Source: Independent WRC archive

Championship standings after the event

References

External links
 Official website of the World Rally Championship
 1974 Safari Rally on Rallye-info.com

Safari Rally
Safari
Safari Rally, 1974